The Arsenal M23 submachine gun (also known as Arsenal Tallinn) was an Estonian submachine gun from 1926 through 1935.

These submachine guns were designed and produced in the Estonian military equipment factory "Arsenal" in Karjamaa, Tallinn, but production was not more than 600 units. The weapon was chambered for the 9x20 mm semi-rimmed Browning cartridge to be compatible with ammunition for the Browning FN M1903 pistol which had been adopted by the Estonian Army. It operated on the blowback system and was essentially similar to the MP18.1; having a wooden stock, slotted barrel jacket, and horizontal left side magazine feed. A uniquely slender 40 round single column box magazine led to frequent cartridge feeding problems; and cooling fins which were machined lengthwise along the barrel to promote cooling air flow when firing (similar to the Lewis machine gun), unnecessarily complicated production.

It was used by the combat support units of the Border Guard, the Estonian Defence League and the Estonian Defence Forces. The Arsenal submachine gun was replaced in Estonian service by the Finnish Suomi KP/-31 submachine gun in 1938. The Estonian Army sold a few samples to Latvia and all of the remainder found their way to Republican forces during the Civil War in Spain.

Used by

 Spanish Republic

References 

Weapons of Estonia
Submachine guns
Military equipment of Estonia